David Aaron Jenkins (April 5, 1822 – September 10, 1886) was a Republican politician and North Carolina State Treasurer from 1868 until 1876. His home was listed on the National Register of Historic Places before being demolished.

He served in the General Assembly. He was the first official elected treasurer after it became a position elected by popular vote under the Constitution of North Carolina of 1868.  He resigned before the end of his term, on which Governor Curtis H. Brogden named the Democrat John M. Worth to replace him. Jenkins was the only Republican elected North Carolina State Treasurer until 2016, when Dale Folwell was elected.

His home located at Gastonia, Gaston County, North Carolina was listed on the National Register of Historic Places in 1978 as the David Jenkins House.

David Jenkins House was a historic home located at Gastonia, Gaston County, North Carolina.  It was built about 1876–1877, and was a two-story, three bay, frame farmhouse with Greek Revival and Italianate style design elements.  It featured a low hip roof supported by ornamental brackets.  It was built by David A. Jenkins (1822–1886), a Republican politician and North Carolina State Treasurer from 1868 until 1876.  The house has been demolished.

It was listed on the National Register of Historic Places in 1978.

References 

State treasurers of North Carolina
North Carolina Republicans
1822 births
1886 deaths
People from Gastonia, North Carolina
19th-century American politicians
Houses on the National Register of Historic Places in North Carolina
Greek Revival houses in North Carolina
Italianate architecture in North Carolina
Houses completed in 1877
Houses in Gaston County, North Carolina
National Register of Historic Places in Gaston County, North Carolina
1877 establishments in North Carolina